The National Market Traders' Federation is an organisation based in the borough of Barnsley, South Yorkshire.

History
It was founded in 1899 by a group of Yorkshire West Riding market traders to represent their interests on a broader level. There are around 1,400 markets in the UK.

Function
It maintains a database of all markets in the UK, including number of stalls and whom to contact. It also offers insurance deals for market traders. It has negotiated deals with large companies, such as the AA, for favourable rates for market traders. Single membership from 21 July 2012 is £102.

External links
 National Market Traders Federation
 How Green Is Your Market

Video clips
 NMTF YouTube channel

Companies based in Barnsley
Organisations based in South Yorkshire
Organizations established in 1899
Retail markets in the United Kingdom
Business organisations based in the United Kingdom